The Thief is a 1914 American silent drama film directed by Edgar Lewis and starring Richard Buhler, Edgar L. Davenport, George De Carlton, and Dorothy Donnelly. It is based on the 1907 play The Thief by Henri Bernstein. The film was released by Box Office Attractions Company on November 19, 1914.

The film was remade as a short film in 1920.

Plot

Cast
 Richard Buhler as Richard Voysin
 Edgar L. Davenport as Mr. Legardes
 George De Carlton as Detective
 Dorothy Donnelly as Marie Landau
 Iva Shepard as Mrs. Legardes
 Harry Spingler as Fernand Legardes

Preservation
The film is now considered lost.

See also
 List of lost films
 1937 Fox vault fire

References

External links
 
 

1914 drama films
Fox Film films
Silent American drama films
1914 films
American silent feature films
American black-and-white films
Lost American films
American films based on plays
1914 lost films
Lost drama films
Films directed by Edgar Lewis
1910s American films